Green Party leadership, or deputy leadership, elections were held in the following countries in 2022:

2022 Green Party of Aotearoa New Zealand co-leadership election
2022 Green Party of Canada leadership election
2022 Green Party (Czech Republic) leadership election
2022 Green Party of England and Wales deputy leadership election